G 9-40 b is a Super-Earth exoplanet that has an orbital period of 5.7 days. The host star is a red dwarf located 91 light years away from Earth between Cancer and Hydra. The planet was discovered in 2019.

See also 
 List of exoplanets discovered in 2019

References 

Exoplanets discovered in 2019
Super-Earths
Transiting exoplanets
Exoplanets discovered by K2